The 1898 Brown Bears football team was an American football team that represented Brown University as an independent during the 1898 college football season. In their first year under head coach Edward N. Robinson, the team compiled a 6–4 record and outscored opponents by a total of 135 to 96. Fred W. Murphy was the team captain.

Schedule

References

Brown
Brown Bears football seasons
Brown Bears football